David Arthur Keene (born May 20, 1945) is an American political consultant, former presidential advisor, and newspaper editor, formerly the Opinion Editor of The Washington Times. Keene was the president of the National Rifle Association for the traditional two one-year terms from 2011 to 2013. From 1984 to 2011, he was the chairman of the American Conservative Union.

Early life and education
Raised in Fort Atkinson, Wisconsin, Keene made a name for himself as chapter leader and eventually national chairman of Young Americans for Freedom (YAF) while at the University of Wisconsin in the 1960s. He supported American efforts to oppose communism and took a strong stance against radicalism on both sides of the debate, particularly the violent efforts to suppress discourse, which he found inconsistent with the basis of educational institutions as bastions of rational thinking and discussion.

Political career
After graduating from college, he ran for the Wisconsin State Senate in 1969 at age 24 in a special election to replace Frank E. Panzer, who had died in office in August that year. Keene ran as a conservative and had Richard Nixon's endorsement, but was defeated by Democrat Dale McKenna in a race to fill the traditionally Republican 13th district senate seat. This was the only time that Keene ran for public office.

Keene later worked as a political assistant to Vice President Spiro Agnew during the Nixon administration, and then in the 1970s as executive assistant to Senator James L. Buckley.

Keene went on to become the southern regional coordinator for Ronald Reagan's 1976 bid for the Republican presidential nomination and national political director for George H. W. Bush's 1980 presidential campaign. He advised Senator Robert Dole's 1988 and 1996 presidential campaigns.  In 2007 he endorsed Mitt Romney for president   and was an advisor to his second run for president.

A campaign consultant or advisor to countless local and state campaigns, Politico's Andy Barr commented that at the peak of his power he had been "counted as one of the few men with both the ear of Republican presidents and an ability to influence the grassroots."

From 2006 to 2007, Keene represented the Nigerian and Algerian governments while working for Carmen Group, a DC lobbying firm.

Civil liberties 
Keene is best known for his efforts on behalf of gun rights. He was appointed by the Bush White House to serve as public delegate to the UN Small Arms and Light Weapons Conference.

In 2007, Keene co-founded the American Freedom Agenda (AFA), which describes itself as "a coalition established to restore checks and balances and civil liberties protections under assault by the executive branch." (In 2007, Keene resigned from the AFA.) He also co-chairs the Constitution Project's Liberty and Security Committee, and has said that "the right to appeal one's detention to an independent judge is a cornerstone of responsible, conservative governance." He has been critical of the Patriot Act, and he has worked with the American Civil Liberties Union to limit the effects of the act.

Keene was Chairman of the American Conservative Union (1984–2011). Instigated by problems his son David Michael Keene was having in filing complaints while serving a 10-year sentence for firearms offenses during a 2002 road rage incident, Keene also had an unlikely collaboration with the American Civil Liberties Union in a campaign to reform the Prison Litigation Reform Act. Keene is a founding member of Right on Crime, a conservative criminal justice reform group.

He co-chairs the Constitution Project's "Liberty & Security" initiative with David Cole of the ACLU that has since 9/11 critiqued government security and surveillance measures in terms of their impact on individual privacy and constitutional rights.

Media appearances 
On March 25, 2017, Keene was a guest on Against the Current (ATC), a "content series devoted to in-depth topical conversations between [radio host] Dan Proft and distinguished guests that are masters in their field of study." ATC's parent organization Upstream Ideas wrote that Keene and Proft discussed "the fundamental problem of how to roll back the size and scope of government." They also talked about lessons that could be learned from the NRA as a successful political movement. Keene also offered his thoughts on media.

In June 2021, Keene was tricked into giving a high school graduation speech defending gun rights in front of 3,044 empty chairs — one for each student who might have graduated in 2021 had they not been a victim of gun violence. The stunt was organized by gun-safety group Change the Ref, which was founded by the parents of a student killed in the Parkland, Florida, massacre. The group released a video of the stunt that went viral and ends by asking viewers to sign a petition pushing for universal background checks.

Awards
In 2004, Keene received the Congress on Racial Equality's prestigious Martin Luther King Award in New York; in March 2012 was recognized by the bi-partisan Constitution Project in Washington as a "Champion of the Constitution"; in early 2016 received the Conservative Political Action Conference's Lifetime Achievement Award; and in September 2016 received the Second Amendment Foundation's Lifetime Achievement Award. His first book is Shall Not Be Infringed: The New Assaults on Your Second Amendment  with Thomas L. Mason, published by Skyhorse Publishing in October 2016.

Personal life
In 2004 Keene married Donna Wiesner Keene, Senior Fellow at the Independent Women's Forum and an appointee in the Reagan, Bush and Bush Administrations. He has five children, Tracey, Kerry, David Michael, Taylor, and Lisa.

References

External links
 Profile at the Carmen Group
 
 Column archive at The Washington Times
 Last column at The Hill
 Collected news and commentary at Bloomberg

American lobbyists
American anti-communists
1945 births
American gun rights activists
Duke University faculty
Harvard Kennedy School staff
Living people
Writers from Alexandria, Virginia
Presidents of the National Rifle Association
Vanderbilt University faculty
University of Wisconsin Law School alumni
The Hill (newspaper) journalists
University of Wisconsin–Madison alumni
Wisconsin Republicans
The Washington Times people
Journalists from Virginia
Constitution Project
People from Fort Atkinson, Wisconsin